Felix Dean (born 27 June 1997) is an Australian actor, known for playing VJ Patterson in the soap opera Home and Away from 2007 and 2014. He also appeared in the sketch comedy series Comedy Inc..

Early and personal life
Dean was born in Sydney on 27 June 1997. He lives in Erskineville with his family.

On 13 October 2021, Joe Anderton of Digital Spy reported that Dean had been arrested for allegedly attacking a store worker. He was charged with a number of offences, including affray, shoplifting, and breaching bail; the conditions of which included a curfew and drug and alcohol tests. Dean had previously been arrested in September and charged with intent to rob and common assault. He was also charged with property damage relating to an alleged incident with a taxi driver in January 2021. Dean was refused bail and was scheduled to appear in court on 19 October 2021.

Career
In 2004, Dean appeared in the television miniseries, Jessica. Two years later he appeared in All Saints as Todd McFarlane. In 2007, Dean made several appearances in Comedy Inc.. That same year he joined the cast of Home and Away as VJ Patterson. For his portrayal of VJ, Dean was nominated for Best Young Actor at the 2008 and 2009 Inside Soap Awards. He left the serial in 2014 and the role was recast. Dean has also appeared in several television commercials. In November 2011, Dean joined the cast of Sam Atwell's play, Bondi Dreaming. The play ran at the Bondi Pavilion until 3 December 2011.

References

External links
Felix Dean at Random Management

1997 births
Living people
Australian male child actors
Male actors from Sydney
Australian male soap opera actors
Australian male stage actors